1991 Soviet Second League was the last edition of the Soviet Second League competition. There were three groups (known as zones) with 66 teams in total (22 in each group). Competitions in the last year "Baltic League" were not held as the Soviet Union was crumbling down.

Next seasons all of the clubs competed in their own national championships and most of them at the top level.

Teams

Locations

Final standings

Zone West

Representation
 : 11
 : 4
  2
  2
  3

Center

East

Representation
 : 8
 : 6
 : 5
 : 1
 : 1
 : 1

Number of teams by union republic

See also
1991 Soviet Top League
1991 Soviet First League
1991 Soviet Second League B

External links
 All-Soviet Archive Site
 1991 Soviet Championship and Cup

 
Soviet Second League seasons
3
Soviet
Soviet
1991 in Armenian football
1991 in Belarusian football
1991 in Kazakhstani football
1991 in Kyrgyzstani football
1991–92 in Moldovan football
1991 in Russian football leagues
1991 in Tajikistani football
1991 in Turkmenistani football
1991 in Ukrainian association football leagues
1991 in Uzbekistani football
1 
1